The 2015–16 Mestis season was the 16th season of the Mestis, the second level of ice hockey in Finland. 12 teams participated in the league, and Jukurit won the championship.

Regular season

Playoffs

SM-Liiga promotion

Tampereen Ilves remained in the SM-Liiga.

Qualification

Play-outs
 JYP-Akatemia - JHT Kalajoki 4:0 on series.
 RoKi - Imatran Ketterä 4:0 on series.

Qualification round

External links
 Official website 

Fin
2015–16 in Finnish ice hockey
Mestis seasons